Carlos Yancy (born June 24, 1970) is a former American football defensive back. He played for the New England Patriots in 1995.

Yancy is from Sarasota and attended Riverview High School.

References

1970 births
Living people
American football defensive backs
Georgia Bulldogs football players
New England Patriots players